Greg Fives (1949 - 15 October 2008) was an Irish Gaelic footballer and hurler.

Born in Abbeyside, County Waterford, Fives first played competitive Gaelic football and hurling in his youth. At club level he played with Abbeyside–Ballinacourty.

In retirement from playing Fives became involved in team management and coaching. At club level he served as a selector with Abbeyside and Ballinacourty, while at inter-county level he was manager of the Waterford senior football and intermediate hurling teams.

Honours

Player

Abbeyside
Waterford Under-21 Hurling Championship (1): 1966

Ballinacourty
Waterford Under-21 Football Championship (1): 1970 (c)

References

1949 births
2008 deaths
Abbeyside hurlers
Ballinacourty Gaelic footballers
Dual players
Gaelic football managers
Gaelic football selectors
Hurling managers
Hurling selectors